This is a list of fountains, drinking fountains and water wells in Bratislava, the capital of Slovakia. Approximately half of the over 140 fountains found in the city form part of the picturesque landscape of the medieval Old Town of Bratislava (the city was known in the past under many names) and serve as tourist attractions while many of the newer fountains are fine examples of socialist era building of modern panelák city suburbs. The number of fountains in Bratislava is comparable to the four times larger neighboring Austrian capital Vienna.

Fountains in Bratislava were first built in the 16th century as means of water supply, the oldest fountain in the city is the Roland Fountain from 1572. The first decorative fountain in Bratislava was the Ganymede's Fountain from 1888. The most famous fountain in the city is the Fountain of Love in the borough of Ružinov which was specifically built as the central setting of the 1986 Czechoslovak hit movie Fountain for Suzanne, directed by Slovak director Dušan Rapoš. The fountain features on the movie's iconic poster. Some fountains (such as the Roland Fountain and the Ganymede's fountain) are part of almost every guided tour of the city, while others (such as the fountain Earth - Planet of peace in front of the Presidential Palace) form part of everyday life in Bratislava and are important meeting points in the city.

Due to Bratislava being in the temperate zone, outdoor fountains are turned off during the winter months. For the city owned fountains the operating season starts in April - May, and the fountains are not turned on en masse, but gradually starting first with the major fountains in the Old Town. The season typically ends in October.

History 
Bratislava, due to its location near the river Danube and due to various streams flowing down from the Little Carpathians mountains, always had plenty of water. Fountains were fed water from the streams uphill through a series of wooden pipes, later replaced by metal ones. Since the origin of the stream was higher than the fountain it fed, gravity ejected the water at the end. The pressure was usually very weak and used for example as water flowing from the mouths of animals. During the coronation festivities accompanying the crowning of the Kings of Hungary in the city between 1563 and 1830, wine was usually poured into the town fountains.

Originally, the project for the tunnel underneath the Bratislava Castle from the 1940s, today used for public transport trams, contained a fountain to be built into the wall of the eastern portal. When looking inside the tunnel, the fountain was supposed to be inside the wall to the right, but this wall was finally constructed shorter and without the fountain. It was supposed to consist of six small half-circle shaped basins arranged into a triangle, with the water cascading from the upper basins into the lower ones.

A new fountain is planned with the reconstruction of the Malokarpatské Námestie in the Lamač borough at least since 2002, but the project is unrealized as of 2012.

Basic description 
The biggest fountain in Bratislava is Fontána Družby on Námestie Slobody, Old Town. The smallest fountain is Girl with a deer on Hviezdoslavovo námestie, Old Town.

As of today, 42 fountains are taken care of by the municipal company Paming - Mestský investor pamiatkovej obnovy, together with 11 small drinking water fountains and 3 water wells, the rest is owned by the Bratislava city boroughs and various private companies and hotels. Four fountains under Paming were out of order in the 2010 summer season: fountain on Námestie slobody, fountain on Námestie M. Benku, fountain on Uránová Street and fountain on Borská Street. All four would require reconstruction before being able to function again.

One fountain, the Fountain for Suzanne in Ružinov, was specially built as the central setting of the 1986 movie of the same name by Slovak director Dušan Rapoš. Fountain for Suzan is still widely known in Slovakia, despite the fountain itself, hidden behind apartment houses, quickly fell into obscurity. Moreover, it was built as a movie prop, without access to public water or electricity. During shooting, the fountain was attached to a cistern truck filled with water. In 2008 the fountain was reconstructed and made functional for the first time.

Many of Bratislava's fountains are tourist attractions, some of them feature in most guided tours. Occasionally, people are fined for swimming or skinny-dipping in the fountains, in most cases foreigners.

Drinking fountains
There are currently 33 public drinking water fountains in Bratislava. They started to appear after the practical aspect of fountains diminished. In the past, the city featured a variety of historical drinking fountains, especially wall-fountains inside the courtyards of rich townspeople mansions. Baroque drinking fountains of this type included Putto s rybou I (Putto with a fish I) and Scharitzerova fontána (Scharitzer drinking fountain) inside the Apponyi Palace, Putto s rybou II on Biela Street survived until today.

Drinking fountains are used especially during the summer, yet a lot of people are reluctant to drink the water due to fear of disease. According to the Public Health Office of Slovakia, all drinking water fountains supply the same tap water as residents have in their homes and the water is safe to drink. Drinking fountains in Bratislava do not feature any instructions on how to operate them.

List of fountains in Bratislava 

The following fountains used to exist in the city in the past:
 Fontána v Rozáriu (Fountain in the rosarium) by Ladislav Majerský (statue), it was originally built in Sad Janka Kráľa, Petržalka in 1937. The statue of a woman was later moved (without the fountain) into the area of swimming pool at Tehelné pole and in the 1970s, the water reservoir was removed from Sad Janka Kráľa (together with the rosarium).
 Unknown  baroque fountain which stood in the front garden of the Aspremonte Palace, in Old Town, it was replaced by Holubia fontána (Pigeon fountain) by Pavel Mikšík in 1986.
 Fontána Rodina (Fountain Family) by Jozef Jankovič, Bachova Street, Ružinov removed in 1974 or 1985 and in 1985 it was replaced by current fountain Mária by Pavel Mikšík.
 Fontána Kvety (Flowers fountain) from 1989 by Ľubomír Jakubčík on Malokarpatské námestie 8 in Lamač was a concrete and ceramic fountain that was damaged and not functional. It was removed in 2012.

List of interior fountains in Bratislava 

The following interior fountains used to exist in the city in the past:
 Fountain inside the lobby of the former hotel Forum (today Crowne Plaza) at Hodžovo námestie, Old Town. The fountain was removed after the hotel was sold and reconstructed.

List of drinking fountains in Bratislava 
Part of the drinking water fountains is out of order at any given time.

List of water wells in Bratislava 
In the middle ages, every house in the walled city of Bratislava had a water well, usually several of them, being the main source of water supply. They were built at terrain level but also in the basements of buildings. Wells in Bratislava were supplied mainly from shallow waters circulating in the Danube river terraces and from three identified streams originating at Kozia Street, Hlboká cesta Street and at the Slavín hill. As of 2011, there were 66 documented wells in the Old Town. 12 are restored and accessible, the well at the courtyard of the Universitas Istropolitana is the oldest. As of today, none of the water wells in Bratislava are actually used and they serve a purely decorative function.

See also 

 History of Bratislava
 Old Town, Bratislava
 Tourism in Slovakia

References 

 Generárlny Investor Bratislavy Company - section on fountains (Slovak)

Bibliography 
 JANOTA, I. Príbehy bratislavských fontán a studní. Bratislava : Marenčin PT. 2009. 192 p. (in Slovak)
 BUBLINCOVÁ, B., HOLČÍK, Š. Bratislavské fontány. Bratislava : Tatran. 1990. 96 p. (in Slovak)

External links 
 Picture gallery of some fountains in Bratislava
 Pictures of some drinking water fountains in Bratislava

Buildings and structures in Bratislava
Tourist attractions in Bratislava
Fountains in Slovakia
Bratislava